Le Cœur des hommes is a 2003 French comedy drama film written and directed by Marc Esposito. The film was followed by two sequels: Le coeur des hommes 2, released in 2007, and Le coeur des hommes 3 in 2013.

The opening and the closing credits of the film feature the song "I'll Stand By You" by The Pretenders.

Main cast
 Bernard Campan – Antoine
 Gérard Darmon – Jeff
 Jean-Pierre Darroussin – Manu
 Marc Lavoine – Alex
 Ludmila Mikaël – Françoise
 Zoé Félix – Elsa
 Florence Thomassin – Juliette
 Alice Taglioni – Annette

Plot
Alex, Antoine, Jeff and Manu have been friends for most of their lives and have achieved their professional goals, therefore all seems to be going well. Suddenly, the death of a father, a wife's infidelity and a daughter's wedding affects them and brings them closer together. Forced to confront situations beyond their control, they share their feelings, support each other, and question the true meaning of their lives. They realise that their relationship with women is at the heart of all their problems, their conversations and their conflicts.

References

External links
 

2003 films
2003 romantic comedy films
Films directed by Marc Esposito
French romantic comedy films
2000s French films